Perilous Times: Free Speech in Wartime from the Sedition Act of 1798 to the War on Terrorism is a 2004 book by American Constitutional law scholar Geoffrey R. Stone, reviewing the treatment of the United States First Amendment during times of war.  It received numerous awards within the fields of history, political science, and law.

Awards
 Robert F. Kennedy Memorial Award for the Best Book of the Year
 Los Angeles Times Book Prize as the Best Book in History
 American Political Science Association’s Kammerer Award for the Best Book of the Year in Political Science
 Goldsmith Book Prize from the Shorenstein Center on Media, Politics and Public Policy
 Scribes Award for the Best Book of the Year in Law

References

2004 non-fiction books
History books about the United States
Books about freedom of speech
First Amendment to the United States Constitution